= Potamonion =

Coastal town of ancient Bithynia

Coordinates: 41°04′56″N 29°04′01″E

Potamonion was a coastal town of ancient Bithynia located on the Bosphorus.

Its site is located near Anadolu Hisar in Asiatic Turkey.
